Marie Sabouret (31 January 1924 – 23 July 1960) was a French stage and film actress.

Filmography

References

Bibliography
 Alastair Phillips. Rififi: French Film Guide. I.B.Tauris, 2009.

External links

1924 births
1960 deaths
French stage actresses
French film actresses
People from La Rochelle
20th-century French women